Colegio Particular Gabriela Mistral is a Chilean high school in Rancagua, Cachapoal Province, Chile. It was established on March 1, 1965.

References 

Educational institutions established in 1965
Secondary schools in Chile
Schools in Cachapoal Province
1965 establishments in Chile